Kasanga (Cassanga) or Haal is a Senegambian language traditionally spoken in a few villages of Guinea-Bissau. The language is referred to as gu-haaca by its speakers. Speakers are shifting to Mandinka.

References

Senegambian languages
Languages of Guinea-Bissau